Holy Week in Guatemala is celebrated with street expressions of faith, called processions, usually organized by a "hermandad". Each procession of Holy Week has processional floats and steps, which are often religious images of the Passion of Christ, or Marian images, although there are exceptions, like the allegorical steps of saints.

History 

The Catholic fervor that currently exists in Guatemala has almost magical and mystical dyes due to the syncretism between the Mayan religion and the Catholic doctrine;  it combines elements dating from the old American cultures and from Catholicism imposed by the Spanish in the Colonial era.

Syncretism appears in subtle factors such as figure drawing of a butterfly on the sawdust carpet for a Christ procession, because the butterfly was more than a mere insect for the Maya. It symbolized the Sun -one of their most important deities-  and also represented life and the afterlife. That image does not appear anywhere in Holy Week activities held in Spain.

Pre-columbine era 

To understand the current Guatemalan Holy Week one must go back to the religion of the Maya, where there were amazing coincidences that perhaps helped the Catholic religion fit more with the beliefs of Native Americans. One of these similarities is that indigenous Guatemalans used a palanquin to transport wealthy citizens and rulers.

For the natives it was  not difficult to understand or accept the existence of the Holy Trinity because for them, the creators of this world were three, known by Mayan scholars as "G1", "G2" and "G3"; neither was to assimilate Virgin Mary, because they associated her with Ixchel -the moon, creative life- mother.

Holy Week in Medieval Europe 

Holy Week was created in the Council of Nicea -set up by the Roman Emperor Constantine I in the year 325 A.D.- because in that council it was decided when to celebrate Passover and how to calculate the date for the celebration. Subsequently, the Order of the Knights Templar promoted the praise for the Passion of Christ. After the disappearance of that order, -close order fourteenth century - the Franciscans were dedicated to preserve the traditions that had been acquired over time; they were the ones who developed the Via Crucis, one of the most representative aspects of the Holy Week festivities.

The first liturgies were celebrated only among religious enclosed in churches, and sinners were not admitted. Later they evolved into processions where people took to the streets to express their guilt.

Bourbon Reforms 

In 1765 the Bourbon reforms were published by the Spanish Crown, which sought to recover the real power over the colonies and increase tax collection.  With these reforms, specific trade regulators were created to control the production of alcoholic beverages, snuff, gunpowder, playing cards and cock fights. The Royal Treasury auctioned annually some trade regulators and then bought them, thus becoming the owner of the monopoly of a certain product. That same year, four sub-delegations of the Royal Treasury were created in San Salvador, Ciudad Real, Comayagua and León and the political and administrative structure of the Captaincy General of Guatemala changed to 15 provinces.

In addition to this administrative redistribution, the Spanish crown established a policy to diminish the power of the Catholic Church, power that until then was virtually all over the Spanish vassals. The policy of reducing power of the church was based on the Enlightenment and had six main points:
 Decline of Jesuit cultural heritage
 Trend towards a secular and secularized culture
 Decidedly rationalist attitude
 Precedence of natural science over religious dogma
 Severe criticism of the role of the church in society, especially the fraier and nun monasteries. These laws sought to limit excessive economic power of some brotherhoods, their large number, the lack of administrative and fiscal control by the authorities and public manifestations of piety, the latter listed as signs of backwardness and fanaticism, especially those of Holy Week.

19th Century 

After the overthrow and expulsion of members of Aycinena Clan in 1829, the Liberals ousted the regular orders and just left the secular clergy in the country, although without the fixed income from mandatory tithing.  This greatly weakened the Catholic Church in Guatemala, but after the failure of liberal governor Mariano Gálvez to combat an epidema of cholera morbus, parish priests incited the peasant population against him, and under the leadership of Rafael Carrera, drove Gálvez and liberal out of power. After a decade of government, Carrera allowed the return of the regular orders and conservative elite Catholics and authorized compulsory tithing again, reinforcing the church in the country and the manifestations of faith such as Holy Week flourished. Indeed, in 1852, Guatemala and the Holy See signed a concordat in which the latter was entrusted with the education of the Guatemalan population and church-state union in the country was reinforced.

After the fall of the Conservative regime and the Liberal victory in 1871, the Catholic Church suffered renewed attacks on its economic and political influence, as happened in 1829 when it was attacked by the Liberal government of Francisco Morazán. In 1873, the regular orders were again evicted, their property confiscated -including convents, haciendas and doctrines of Indians throughout the country- and mandatory tithing was abolished, leaving the secular clergy relegated to their parishes without stable income.

In May 1891, Pope Leo XIII issued his Rerum Novarum encyclical -The situation of workers- key document that helped Catholic Church parishes gradually transform to fit in liberal states;  in Guatemala this reorganization was reinforced by a new form of reproduction of ideas expressed in the press whose images and speeches were sent to the faithful for an efficient postal service developed by the Liberal State. The progress of Catholicism in the United States began to serve as an example in the reconquest of ideological power in totally liberal states.

There was a strengthening of Catholicism during the government of General José María Reyna Barrios (1892–1898), thanks to the political opening of his government to secular clergy and his concern for the dissemination of art and the defense of local culture, which led him to subscribe to the Berne Convention, respecting the popular manifestations of faith, expressed primarily in the processions of the Passion of christ.  And this was accomplished even though Reyna Barrios was a high degree Freemason. However, the official entry of the regular orders was not allowed because the Guatemalan constitution forbid their presence in its soil at the time.

20th Century 

After the fall of Jacobo Arbenz regime, the Catholic Church regained some of the power he had had during the Conservative government of Rafael Carrera in the nineteenth century, and as part of it, private religious education boomed from 1955 on, with the founding of several elite schools for boys  which absorbed the elite students who had previously attended classes in secular government institutions.

Even though the Archbishop of Guatemala, Mariano Rossell y Arellano, published a letter explaining that the Catholic Church was not seeking privileges in its fight against Arbenz, he managed to get that the government of Colonel Carlos Castillo Armas incorporated in the Constitution of 1956 these:
 the legal capacity of the Catholic Church-and all other churches- to acquire, hold and dispose of property, provided they are intended for religious and social work or education.
 religious education was declared optional in official premises: Article 97 of the Constitution states that the law would regulate regard to religious education in official premises and that the State did not impart but declared optional. It also guarantees freedom of education in all other establishments.
 the state would contribute to the maintenance of religious education: Article 111 states that private institutions providing free education will be exempt from certain state and municipal tax in compensation for their services.

Rossell y Arellano started an aggressive campaign to get Catholicism back in Guatemala: he restored the Archbishop's Palace and the residence of Bishop Francisco Marroquín in San Juan del Obispo, Sacatepequez; on July 22, 1953 he received fathers Antonio Rodríguez Pedrazuela and José María Báscones who began the work of Opus Dei in Guatemala; and in 1959 held the First Central American Eucharistic Congress. Gradually he managed the get regular orders back to Guatemala and participated in several sessions of the Second Vatican Council, organized by Pope John XXIII.

Over the years, and with advances in transportation and communication, the number of pilgrims and devotion to the Lord of Esquipulas made the city "Latin American Capital of Faith". In 1956 Pope Pius XII erected the Prelature Nullius Cristi of Esquipulas, which is formed by the Municipality of Esquipulas and its cathedral Sanctuary. The Pope also appointed as Prime Esquipulas Prelate Archbishop Rossell y Arellano. One of the first concerns of Rossell was seeking a religious community to take over the pastoral care of the temple;  after many failed initiatives, he managed to find support from the Benedictine Abbey of San José in Louisiana, United States. On Palm Sunday of 1959, the first three Benedictine monks arrived at Esquipulas and founded the Benedictine Monastery. Considering many religious, cultural and historical aspects Pope John XXIII agreed to the request made by Bishop Rossell Arellano and raised the Sanctuary of Esquipulas to the rank of  Minor Basilica in 1961.

Holy Week art

Sculptures

Arte efímero

Processions

Guatemala City

Antigua Guatemala

See also 

 Antigua Guatemala
 Guatemala City
 Sólo de noche vienes

General:
 Public holidays in Guatemala
 Chivarreto boxing- a sports tournament held annually on good Friday near Guatemala City

Notes and references

Notes

References

Bibliography

External links

History of Guatemala
Holy Week processions
Guatemalan culture
Religious festivals in Guatemala
Parades in Guatemala